Hartenberg (or Hartenberk) is the ruin of a castle over the village of Hřebeny in the municipality of Josefov in the Karlovy Vary Region of the Czech Republic.

History
Hartenberg Castle was built by the lords of Hartenberg, probably in 1196. The first written mention is from 1214. The Hartenberg family owned the castle until 1362, when Těma of Koldice obtained it from them and traded it in 1364 with Charles IV for Bautzen. At the beginning of 15th century the Hartenberg family received the castle again but soon sold it to Jan Maleřík. His descendants used the castle as the center of robbery attacks and that was why in 1459 the castle was besieged by the military of the town Cheb, conquered and plundered. Later the Schlicks owned the castle, the town of Loket and the Písnic family who held it more than 150 years. In the second half of the 18th century, the Ausperg family inherited the castle. From the 17th to the 19th century, modifications occurred. The last owner of Hartenberg was Františka Kopalová who inherited it in 1913 from her mother, Marie. After the World War II, she was expelled and relocated to Germany.

After 1945 the castle was owned by State forests and was used as a warehouse and granary. In 1983, there were plans for its reconstruction. But it ultimately never happened. From 1984–91, the castle was several times deliberately set on fire, and turned in ruins.

The castle is now owned by Bedřich Loos, a private owner who tries to maintain and repair the castle. There was elaborated the so-called Hartenberg Workshop. Already more than a thousand volunteers from all over the world participated in the repair of the castle. This workshop is the largest volunteer program in Europe.

Gallery

References

External links

Buildings and structures completed in the 12th century
Castles in the Karlovy Vary Region
Ruined castles in the Czech Republic
Tourist attractions in the Karlovy Vary Region
Sokolov District